/s/ may refer to:

Signature, a mark that a person writes on documents as a proof of identity and intent
Voiceless alveolar sibilant, a type of  voiceless alveolar fricative
"Sexy Beautiful Women", a forum of 4chan